Suresh de Mel was a Sri Lankan cricketer who played for Old Cambrians.

De Mel made a single first-class appearance, during the 1991/92 season, against Tamil Union in November 1991. Batting in the tailend, he scored 0 in the first innings in which he batted and finished 0 not out in the second. He took figures of 1–52 in an innings defeat for the team.

External links
Suresh de Mel at Cricket Archive

Sri Lankan cricketers
Living people
Place of birth missing (living people)
Year of birth missing (living people)
20th-century Sri Lankan people